is a role-playing video game video game developed by Winkysoft and published by Banpresto, which was released in Japan on March 22, 1996.

The first Super Robot Wars title to give original characters the spotlight, exclusively. This particular title follows the storyline of the Masoukishin and its cast. It is the first to feature non-superdeformed graphics, unlike most Super Robot Wars titles, and the first to feature a 45° angle view of the map (widely seen since). It is also the only regular game where a unit's elevation and the direction it is facing at the end of its turn are important. Does not include other real robot or super robot series.

Media
The game has received remakes made available via Nintendo DS and the Sony PSP under the name Super Robot Wars OG Saga: Masoukishin – The Lord Of Elemental.

References

External links
 The Website of the Remake 

1996 video games
Banpresto games
Japan-exclusive video games
Nintendo DS games
PlayStation Portable games
Role-playing video games
Super Nintendo Entertainment System games
Super Robot Wars
Video games developed in Japan
Winkysoft games